Tysovets is a village in Stryi Raion, Lviv Oblast in western Ukraine. It is a famous ski area and resort. Tysovets belongs to Kozova rural hromada, one of the hromadas of Ukraine.

Until 18 July 2020, Tysovets belonged to Skole Raion. The raion was abolished in July 2020 as part of the administrative reform of Ukraine, which reduced the number of raions of Lviv Oblast to seven. The area of Skole Raion was merged into Stryi Raion.

See also
Lviv bid for the 2022 Winter Olympics

References

Villages in Stryi Raion
Populated places established in the 1530s
Ski areas and resorts in Ukraine